Galium anisophyllon, common name bedstraw or gaillet, is a flowering perennial plant in the family Rubiaceae.

Description
It is a herbaceous plant with quadrangular and branched stem, oblong or lanceolate-linear leaves, 15 mm long and 2 mm wide. Flowers are white to yellowish-white, in loose umbels. Corolla is up to 4 mm wide. They bloom from June to September.

Distribution and habitat
Galium anisophyllon  is widespread in Central and Southern Europe from France to Poland and Ukraine. It is present in the mountains, in meadows, rocky crevices and in forests, at altitudes above 1000 m.

Subspecies
Two subspecies are currently recognized (May 2014):

Galium anisophyllon subsp. anisophyllon - most of species range
Galium anisophyllon subsp. plebeium (Boiss. & Heldr.) Ehrend - Balkan Peninsula

References

External links
TUTIN & al., 1964–1980. Flora Europaea, (5 vol.).
Biolib
The Plant List
Catalogue of Life 
Tela Botanica
Medherbs
Botanik im Bild, Flora von Österreich, Liechtenstein und Südtirol, Alpen-Labkraut  /  Ungleichblättriges Labkraut
Forum Acta Plantarum 

anisophyllon
Herbs
Flora of France
Flora of Austria
Flora of Germany
Flora of Poland
Flora of the Czech Republic
Flora of Switzerland
Flora of Albania
Flora of Italy
Flora of Greece
Flora of Romania
Flora of Ukraine
Flora of Yugoslavia